Fiona Talkington is a broadcaster, writer, presenter, and curator best known in the UK for her work on BBC Radio 3 where she has been a presenter since 1989.
She is best known today as a founding presenter (1999) of the Sony Gold Award-winning programme Late Junction, and is internationally recognized for her wide-ranging knowledge of music including  classical, world, traditional, jazz, experimental, electronica and choral music.

BBC
For BBC Radio 3 she has presented and produced a wide variety of  programmes such as Sony Gold Award-winning Late Junction, Composer of the Week (working with trumpeter John Wallace on a notable series on John Philip Sousa and Scott Joplin), Radio 3 Requests, the BBC Proms, Breakfast, Sacred and Profane, Afternoon on 3 and Womad. She is also particularly known for her many years as presenter of live chamber music concerts, broadcast around Europe, from London’s Wigmore Hall.

She has also presented for BBC World Service, BBC Radio 4 and for BBC Radio 6 Music, and has produced documentaries and features ranging from Ragtime Music in Hungary, the repatriation of Bartók’s remains to his homeland, Icelandic contemporary music, the work of Isambard Kingdom Brunel, Prokofiev, the statues of Hyde Park.
Her interviewees range from David Sylvian, Jon Anderson, Greg Lake to Sir Simon Rattle, Daniel Barenboim, Jan Garbarek.

Other Work
As curator she has worked extensively with Kings Place in London, curating a 10-day festival of Norwegian arts and music, Scene Norway, in 2008, an Estonian Festival, Eesti Fest, in 2011, and Scene Norway2 in November 2013. For the Royal Opera House, Covent Garden she has curated Voices around the World, and for Nasjonal Jazzscene in Oslo she is curator of the conexions series which brings together British and Norwegian musicians. She has helped to organized concerts in a wide range of venues including the Barbican Centre in London, Pizza Express, LSO St Luke’s and the Cheltenham Jazz Festival.

Fiona is recognized for her extensive role in the Norwegian Arts world, and has become closely associated with the Punkt Festival in Kristiansand. In 2009 she was awarded the Royal Norwegian Order of Merit for her services to Norwegian Arts, and in 2003 she was presented with the Molde Rose award at the Molde International Jazz Festival.

As a writer she is a regular contributor to Songlines magazine, and has written for The Guardian and The Independent newspapers, and has contributed to  books in Germany on the ECM record label, and in Norway for a celebration of the 75th anniversary of NOPA.

Fiona is Vice-President of the Grieg Society of Great Britain, and is a Trustee of the Whitley Arts Festival.

Personal
Fiona was born in Reading, where she lives, and has two children.  From 1985 to 1989 she presented the classical programme Masterworks on Radio 210 (now Heart).  She then worked for BBC Wiltshire Sound.

She studied at Liverpool University, The Open University and University of Reading and has taught for The Open University and University of Reading. Her MA is in Literature and the Visual Arts 1840-1940; in her studies she specialised in the Omega Workshops and the writings of Sir Kenneth Clark.

In 2008 Fiona was diagnosed with breast cancer and was treated at the Royal Berkshire Hospital. She is passionate about the support for and awareness of cancer and its effects on patients and carers.

References

BBC Radio 4 presenters
BBC Radio 3 presenters
BBC Radio 6 Music presenters
British women radio presenters
Living people
People from Reading, Berkshire
Year of birth missing (living people)